Fourth Fleet or 4th fleet may mean:

 Fourth Fleet (Australia), an unofficial term for convict ships from England in 1792 
 United States Fourth Fleet
 IJN 4th Fleet, Imperial Japanese Navy
 Luftflotte 4

See also
 
 
 
 
 Fourth (disambiguation)
 Fleet (disambiguation)
 Third Fleet (disambiguation)
 Fifth Fleet (disambiguation)